Gerard Anthony Yantz (27 June 1917 - 21 May 1989) was an American male handball player. He was a member of the United States men's national handball team. He was part of the  team at the 1936 Summer Olympics, playing 3 matches. On club level he played for German Sport Club Brooklyn in the United States.

Additionally he was a track athlete for the Grover Cleveland High School (Queens).

References

1989 deaths
Field handball players at the 1936 Summer Olympics
1917 births
American male handball players
Olympic handball players of the United States
Sportspeople from New York (state)